Acmaturris ampla is a species of sea snail, a marine gastropod mollusk in the family Mangeliidae.

Description
The length of the shell attains 8 mm.

Distribution
This marine species occurs in the Pacific Ocean off Ecuador

References

 McLean, J.H. & Poorman, R. (1971) New species of tropical Eastern Pacific Turridae. The Veliger, 14, 89–113

External links
 
 Biolib.cz: original image of a shell of Acmaturris ampla

ampla
Gastropods described in 1971